Central Texas Christian School (CTCS) is a private pre-K-12 Christian school in Temple, Texas whose goal is to graduate students who are academically and spiritually ready for leadership. CTCS is associated with the Association of Christian Schools International (ACSI).

History

In 2014 Brian Littlefield, previously head of First Baptist Academy of Dallas, became the head of Central Texas Christian.

Athletics
Baseball
Softball
Basketball
Cheerleading
Football
Track and Field
Volleyball
Cross Country
Golf
Tennis

References

External links
  Official Website

Christian schools in Texas
Private K-12 schools in Texas
High schools in Bell County, Texas
1987 establishments in Texas
Educational institutions established in 1987